Tinnakorn Asurin (born 19 February 1990) is a Thai professional footballer who plays as a centre back for Thai League 1 club Khon Kaen United.

References

External links
 

1990 births
Living people
Tinnakorn Asurin
Tinnakorn Asurin
Association football defenders
Tinnakorn Asurin
Tinnakorn Asurin
Tinnakorn Asurin
Tinnakorn Asurin
Tinnakorn Asurin
Tinnakorn Asurin